Robert Paul Gould III (born December 6, 1982) is an American football placekicker who is currently a free agent. He played with the Chicago Bears from 2005 to 2015, during which he became the franchise's all-time leading scorer. Gould was originally signed by the New England Patriots as an undrafted free agent in 2005. He played college football at Penn State.

Gould is the 8th most accurate placekicker in NFL history.

Early years
Gould was born to Cheryl and Robert Gould in Jersey Shore, Pennsylvania. His father was a three-time All-American soccer player who led Lock Haven University to a Division II national championship in 1980. and was drafted by the St. Louis Steamers in the early 1980s. He attended Central Mountain High School in Mill Hall, Pennsylvania, where he won letters in football, soccer, basketball, and track.

College career
Gould was originally interested in pursing professional soccer while still in high school. Choosing football instead, he asked his principal to send a letter of recommendation to Penn State University head football coach Joe Paterno, who invited him to try out as a freshman walk-on. Gould enrolled at Penn State, where he played for the Nittany Lions football team and earned a degree in business management. In four years with the Nittany Lions, he converted 115 of 121 extra point attempts and 39 of 61 field goal attempts.

Collegiate statistics

Professional career
After going undrafted in the 2005 NFL Draft, Gould was signed as a free agent by the defending Super Bowl champion New England Patriots prior to the 2005 NFL preseason — even though they already had established Super Bowl-winning placekicker Adam Vinatieri. Following his preseason release from the Patriots, Gould signed with the Baltimore Ravens only to be waived three weeks later. He then found construction work with M&R Contracting in Mill Hall, Pennsylvania.

Chicago Bears
The Chicago Bears signed Gould on October 8, 2005, following the Week 3 injury of their starting kicker, Doug Brien. Gould kicked his first NFL field goal the next week in a 20–10 road loss against the Cleveland Browns, and his first game-winner in Week 9 against the New Orleans Saints. He earned NFC Special Teams Player of the Week for his game against the Saints. In his rookie season, Gould appeared in 13 games and converted 19 of 20 extra point attempts and 21 of 27 field goal attempts.

Gould kicked 26 consecutive field goals in 2006, breaking former Bears' kicker Kevin Butler's record of most consecutive field goals and winning NFC Special Teams Player of the Week for Week 16 against the Detroit Lions and NFC Special Teams Player of the Month for October 2006 in the process. He was also named to the 2006 All-Pro team by the Associated Press. In addition, NFL fans across the nation voted Gould the NFC's kicker for the 2007 Pro Bowl. His 25-yard overtime field goal against the Tampa Bay Buccaneers gave the Bears home-field advantage throughout the ensuing playoffs. On January 14, 2007, his 49-yard field goal in overtime against the Seattle Seahawks gave the Bears their first divisional playoff win since 1988, advancing them to the NFC Championship, which they defeated the New Orleans Saints by a score of 39–14. The Bears later lost Super Bowl XLI to the Indianapolis Colts by a score of 29–17. He earned First Team All-Pro honors.

In the 2007 season, Gould appeared in all 16 games and converted all 33 extra point attempts and 31 of 36 field goal attempts.

In 2008, Gould was named NFC Special Teams Player of the Month for December 2008 after making all eight of his field-goal attempts including two more overtime game-winners, becoming the fourth kicker of overtime game-winning field goals in back-to-back games in NFL history. He converted 26 of 29 field-goal attempts (89.7 percent) in 2008, breaking his own franchise single-season record for accuracy. Going into the 2009 season, he had converted 84.8 percent of his career field goal attempts.

On May 12, 2008, he signed a five-year extension with the Bears that would keep him on the team through the 2013 season. The contract, reportedly worth $15.5 million, included a $4.25 million signing bonus and made Gould the NFL's highest-paid kicker.

In the 2009 season, Gould appeared in all 16 games and converted all 33 extra point attempts and 24 of 28 field goal attempts.

In the 2010 season, Gould appeared in all 16 games and converted all 35 extra point attempts and 25 of 30 field goal attempts.

In the 2011 season, Gould appeared in all 16 games and converted all 37 extra point attempts and 28 of 32 field goal attempts.

In the 2012 season, Gould made his tenth career game-winning field goal against the Carolina Panthers in Week 8, and his ten consecutive field goals from 50 yards or more without a miss was second behind Tony Zendejas. Before pregame warm-ups during Week 14 against the Minnesota Vikings, Gould strained his left calf. After limited play during the game, he was placed on injured reserve for the rest of the year. On the year, he converted all 33 extra point attempts and 21 of 25 field goal attempts in 13 games.

In the 2013 regular season opener against the Cincinnati Bengals, Gould made a 58-yard field goal late in the first half, setting the Bears record for longest field goal and tying him with Zendejas for most consecutive 50+-yard field goals without a miss with eleven. During Week 13 against the Minnesota Vikings, Gould missed a career-high two field goals, tying his two missed kicks in 2006 against the St. Louis Rams; the two field goals were a 66-yarder, which would have broken the NFL record for longest field goal converted, and a 47-yarder in overtime. On December 27, Gould signed a four-year extension with the Bears worth $15 million, with $9 million guaranteed, the most by a kicker. Gould ended the 2013 season converting 26 of 29 field goal attempts and 45 of 46 extra points for a total of 123 points scored. Gould became the second player in Bears history to record 1,000 points, with 1,025, 91 points behind Kevin Butler. Gould's seven seasons with at least 100 points is a Chicago Bears record.

In the 2014 season, Gould appeared in 12 games and converted 28 of 29 extra point attempts and nine of 12 field goal attempts. He suffered a quad injury which cost him some time.

In Week 4 of the 2015 season, Gould converted a go-ahead 49-yard field goal to put the Bears up 22–20 over the Oakland Raiders. Gould earned NFC Special Teams Player of the Week for the first time since the 2006 season. In Week 5 against the Kansas City Chiefs, Gould became the Bears' all-time scoring leader with 1,118 points, overtaking Kevin Butler's record by two, with a 30-yard field goal in the third quarter. At the end of the season, Gould had made 33 field goals, the most ever for a Bears kicker in a single season and the second-most in the NFL. He concluded the year having converted 33 of 39 field goals for an 84.6 percentage, 19th in the league, and leading the Bears in scoring with 127 points. However, he struggled during the later portion of the season, missing two field goals against the San Francisco 49ers and a potential game-tying kick against the Washington Redskins, with a combined two of five field goals converted in those two games.

In 2016, Gould was awarded the Ed Block Courage Award. He was released by the Bears in a cost-saving move on September 4, 2016. The change occurred just one week before their first regular season game, and after a preseason where he had made 5 of 6 field goal attempts but missed two extra-point attempts, one of which was the result of a bad snap. Gould, the longest-tenured player for the Bears, ended his career in Chicago as the team's all-time leader in career points (1,207), field goals made (276), and career field goals of at least 50 yards (23).

New York Giants
In the wake of Josh Brown's domestic abuse investigation, Gould was signed by the New York Giants on October 20, 2016. Gould took the number 5 because Giants' punter Brad Wing already had his preferred 9. He kicked his first field goal for the Giants against the Los Angeles Rams On October 23. In the November 20 game against the Chicago Bears, Gould kicked a 46-yard field goal but missed two extra point attempts against his former team. He kicked four field goals against the Philadelphia Eagles on December 22. Gould was 10 for 10 on field goals for the Giants.

San Francisco 49ers

2017 season

On March 9, 2017, Gould signed a two-year contract with the San Francisco 49ers.

In his 49ers debut, Gould kicked a 44-yard field goal against the Carolina Panthers in a 23–3 loss. Three weeks later, he kicked five field goals against the Arizona Cardinals. During a Week 13 road game against the Chicago Bears, Gould kicked five field goals to lift the 49ers over his former team 15–14, earning him NFC Special Teams Player of the Week for his performance. In the next game, Gould kicked four field goals against the Houston Texans as the 49ers won on the road by a score of 26-16. The following week, he booted six field goals, including a 45-yard game winner as time expired in a 25–23 win over the Tennessee Titans, earning him NFC Special Teams Player of the Week. The last time a 49ers kicker made six field goals in a game was in 1996 by Jeff Wilkins. In the month of December, Gould earned Special Teams Player of the Month.

Gould finished the season third in scoring with 145 points from 28 extra points and 39 field goals converted. He was voted as an alternate to the 2018 Pro Bowl.

2018 season
In Week 2, Gould kicked three field goals, including a 36-yard game-winner, in a 30–27 win over the Detroit Lions, earning him NFC Special Teams Player of the Week. In Week 15, Gould converted all four field-goal attempts, including a 36-yard game-winner in overtime, in a 26–23 win over the Seattle Seahawks, earning him NFC Special Teams Player of the Week. Gould was named NFC Special Teams Player of the Month for December. Overall, in the 2018 season, Gould converted 27 of 29 extra point attempts and 33 of 34 field goal attempts.

2019 season

On February 26, 2019, the 49ers placed the franchise tag on Gould. On April 24, Gould requested a trade from San Francisco. However, on July 15, Gould and the 49ers reached an agreement on a four-year, $19 million extension with $10.5 million guaranteed. In the 2019 season, he converted 41 of 42 extra point attempts and 23 of 31 field goal attempts. Gould contributed to two wins by kicking a game-winning field goal, one in Week 14 against the New Orleans Saints and one in Week 16 against the Los Angeles Rams. For his game against the Rams, he earned NFC Special Teams Player of the Week. For the month of December, Gould earned NFC Special Teams Player of the Month.

In Super Bowl LIV, Gould's second Super Bowl and tenth NFL playoff game, Gould made both his field goals raising his career playoff totals to 15-for-15. However, the 49ers lost 31-20 to the Kansas City Chiefs.

2020 season
In Week 12 against the Los Angeles Rams, Gould hit the 42-yard game winning field goal during the 23–20 win. Gould was named the NFC Special Teams Player of the Week for his performance in Week 12. On December 30, 2020, Gould and the 49ers agreed to a two-year, $7.25 million extension. He was placed on the reserve/COVID-19 list by the team on the same day, and activated on January 14, 2021. Gould finished the 2020 season converting 36 of 38 extra point tries and 19 of 23 field goal tries.

2021 season
On October 5, 2021, Gould was placed on injured reserve after suffering a groin injury before Week 4. He was activated on November 6.

In Week 18 against the Los Angeles Rams, Gould had to take over punting duties in addition to kicking duties after punter Mitch Wishnowsky suffered a concussion in the first half of the game. He punted twice for 90 yards and made two field goals, including the game-winner in overtime, to help the 49ers win 27-24 and clinch a playoff berth. For his performance, Gould was named NFC Special Teams Player of the Week. In the 2021 season, Gould converted 39 of 40 extra point attempts and 20 of 23 field goal attempts.

In the NFC Divisional Round of the playoffs, Gould kicked the game-winning 45-yard field goal as time expired to upset the top-seeded Green Bay Packers 13–10, and advance the 49ers to the NFC Championship Game. This put Gould at a perfect 20-for-20 on field goal attempts in the playoffs for his career.

2022 season
On March 4, 2023, Gould announced that he will depart from San Francisco after six seasons and play somewhere else for the 2023 NFL season.

NFL career statistics

Personal life

Despite the difference in spelling, his surname ("Gould") uses the same pronunciation as the element (gold): "gōld". This has prompted some announcers to dub him "Robbie Gould is gold", "Solid Gould" or "Good as Gould" upon his successful field goal attempts.

His younger brother, Chris Gould, was a kicker for the University of Virginia and in the Arena Football League, and is currently an assistant special teams coach for the Los Angeles Chargers. The two also have a cousin, Brandon Thomas Gould, who played on the offensive line for Bethune-Cookman University.

On December 1, 2013, Gould's wife Lauren gave birth to their first child, a son.

When asked what he would like to do upon retiring from football, Gould said, "I went to Penn State and graduated with a business management degree. I would love to run a huge corporation at some time. Obviously I'm going to take baby steps. I'm going to play in the NFL as long as they will let me play but I've done a pretty good job trying to set myself up for that transition out of football. Whether it's starting to co-host a radio show on ESPN100 or doing Monday morning call-ins after the games with one of the local radio stations or interning with buddies of mine who own huge companies."

References

External links

 San Francisco 49ers bio

1982 births
Living people
American football placekickers
Penn State Nittany Lions football players
People from Clinton County, Pennsylvania
People from Jersey Shore, Pennsylvania
Players of American football from Pennsylvania
New England Patriots players
Baltimore Ravens players
Chicago Bears players
New York Giants players
San Francisco 49ers players
National Conference Pro Bowl players
Ed Block Courage Award recipients